The 2022–23 Algerian Ligue 2 is the 59th season of the Algerian Ligue 2 since its establishment. The competition is organized by the Ligue Nationale de football Amateur and consists of two groups of 16. It began on 16 September 2022 and will conclude in May 2023.

Stadiums and locations

Group Centre-east
Note: Table lists in alphabetical order.

Group Centre-west
Note: Table lists in alphabetical order.

Locations

Group Centre-east

League table

Results

Clubs season-progress

Group Centre-west

League table

Results

Clubs season-progress

See also
 2022–23 Algerian Ligue Professionnelle 1

References

External links
 Ligue Nationale de Football Amateur
 Algerian Football Federation

Algerian Ligue 2 seasons
Algeria